The Rhodes 18 is an American trailerable day sailer or sailing dinghy that was designed by Philip Rhodes in 1938 and first built in 1948. It is Rhodes' design #448.

Production
The design has been built by Cape Cod Shipbuilding in the United States since 1948 and remains in production.

Design
The boat was designed as a junior trainer for the Stamford Yacht Club in Connecticut.

The Rhodes 18 is a recreational sailboat, initially built from wood, since 1965 it has been constructed from fiberglass, with wood trim. The hull has decks all around the cockpit. It has a fractional sloop rig, a plumb stem, a vertical transom, a transom-hung rudder controlled by a tiller and a retractable centerboard or an optional fixed fin keel. The centerboard version displaces , while the keelboat model displaces . With no centerboard truck, the keel-equipped version provides more unobstructed cockpit space.

The boat will hold five adults, but is normally sailed with a crew of two.

As sold new, the boat does not come with sails, which are extra-cost options. Other options include a roller furling jib, boom vang, cockpit cover and a boat trailer for the centerboard version.

See also
List of sailing boat types

References

External links
Official website
Photo of a Rhodes 18 sailing with spinnaker

Keelboats
Dinghies
1980s sailboat type designs
Sailing yachts 
Trailer sailers
Sailboat type designs by Philip Rhodes
Sailboat types built by Cape Cod Shipbuilding